Păsăreni is a commune in Mureș County, Transylvania, Romania composed of three villages:

Bolintineni / Nyárádbálintfalva
Gălățeni / Szentgerice
Păsăreni

Demographics
According to the 2011 census, it has a population of 1,907 of which 81% are Hungarian, 11% are Roma and 5% are Romanian.

Natives
Iuliu Szöcs

See also 
 List of Hungarian exonyms (Mureș County)

References

Communes in Mureș County
Localities in Transylvania